The Arabian Sea Country Club (ASCC) is mainly a golf course, with several other sporting facilities, located in Karachi, Sindh, Pakistan. The golf course was designed by K. Okada San of Taisei Corporation.

History
Arabian Sea Country Club was founded in 1997.

The club also has an international standard cricket ground which has been used as a training camp of Afghanistan national cricket team.

References

External links 
 Arabian Sea Country Club - Official site
 Arabian Sea Country Club

Golf clubs and courses in Pakistan
Sports venues in Karachi
Cricket grounds in Pakistan
1997 establishments in Pakistan